Kouatie is a village in the Kara Region of northern Togo. 
Nearby towns and villages include Koukouo Tougou (1.4 nm), Bako Samaba (2.8 nm), Koupagou (2.0 nm) and Dissani (2.2 nm).

References

External links
Satellite map at Maplandia.com

Populated places in Kara Region